Roc Oliva Isern (born 18 July 1989), also known as "Metra", is a Spanish former field hockey player who played as a midfielder or forward for the Spanish national team.

Oliva played most of his career for Atlètic Terrassa HC but from the 2018–19 season onwards he played for Real Club de Polo until his retirement in 2021. He also played for Amsterdam and HGC in the Dutch Hoofdklasse. His father Jordi and sister Georgina are also both Olympic hockey players. He played a total of 189 times for the Spanish national team from 2007 until 2021.

International career
Oliva was a member of the Spanish National Team that claimed the silver medal at the 2008 Summer Olympics in Beijing, PR China.  He also competed at the 2012 and 2016 Olympics. After the 2016 Olympic Games, he did play for the national team for three years. In October 2019, he was brought back into the national team for the 2019 Men's FIH Olympic Qualifiers. On 25 May 2021, he was selected in the squad for the 2021 EuroHockey Championship. On 28 May 2021 he had to withdraw from the squad because of his imminent fatherhood. He returned in the national team for the 2020 Summer Olympics, after the Olympics he retired as a hockey player.

References

External links
 
 
 
 

1989 births
Living people
People from Vallès Occidental
Sportspeople from the Province of Barcelona
Spanish male field hockey players
Male field hockey midfielders
Male field hockey forwards
Olympic field hockey players of Spain
Field hockey players at the 2008 Summer Olympics
2010 Men's Hockey World Cup players
Field hockey players at the 2012 Summer Olympics
2014 Men's Hockey World Cup players
Field hockey players at the 2016 Summer Olympics
Field hockey players at the 2020 Summer Olympics
Olympic silver medalists for Spain
Olympic medalists in field hockey
Medalists at the 2008 Summer Olympics
Amsterdamsche Hockey & Bandy Club players
Atlètic Terrassa players
Real Club de Polo de Barcelona players
HGC players
Men's Hoofdklasse Hockey players
División de Honor de Hockey Hierba players
Expatriate field hockey players
Spanish expatriate sportspeople in the Netherlands